Wágner de Andrade Borges (born 3 April 1987), known simply as Wágner, is a Brazilian professional footballer who plays for Portuguese club Aliados Lordelo as a forward.

Honours
Moreirense
Segunda Liga: 2013–14

Zawisza Bydgoszcz
Polish SuperCup: 2014

Paços Ferreira
Segunda Liga: 2018–19

References

External links

1987 births
Living people
People from São José dos Campos
Brazilian footballers
Footballers from São Paulo (state)
Association football forwards
Rio Claro Futebol Clube players
Primeira Liga players
Liga Portugal 2 players
Segunda Divisão players
Moreirense F.C. players
C.D. Nacional players
C.D. Tondela players
F.C. Paços de Ferreira players
G.D. Chaves players
F.C. Penafiel players
U.D. Vilafranquense players
Ekstraklasa players
Zawisza Bydgoszcz players
Thai League 2 players
Thai Honda F.C. players
Brazilian expatriate footballers
Expatriate footballers in Portugal
Expatriate footballers in Poland
Expatriate footballers in Thailand
Brazilian expatriate sportspeople in Portugal
Brazilian expatriate sportspeople in Poland
Brazilian expatriate sportspeople in Thailand